S.T. 01 NOW is South Korean boy band SS501's first full-length studio album, released on November 10, 2006 by DSP Media.

The album title was named after the combination of "S" from SS501, "T" from Triple S (SS501's official fanclub), and "01 NOW" which, when combined altogether, means "SS501 and Triple S united as one from now until forever".

Their first single track from the album is "Unlock", followed by the funky hip-hop rhythm "Four Chance", and bright and lively pop song "Coward".

Track listing

Music videos
 "Unlock"
 "Four Chance"
 "Coward"

Release history

References

External links

 
 

SS501 albums
2006 albums